"All Day Long" is a song co-written and recorded by American country music singer Garth Brooks.  It was released as the first single off Brooks' fourteenth studio album Fun.  The song was written by Brooks, Bryan Kennedy and Mitch Rossell.

Charts

Weekly charts

Year-end charts

References

2018 singles
2018 songs
Garth Brooks songs
Songs written by Garth Brooks